Waynesboro is a city in and the county seat of Wayne County, Tennessee, United States. The population was 2,449 at the 2010 census, up from 2,228 in 2000.

History

Waynesboro was founded in 1821 as a county seat for the newly created Wayne County.  The city initially consisted of a  plot that included the courthouse and jail.  A school, Ashland Academy, was established in 1843. The city incorporated in 1850.

Geography
State Route 99, which intersects US 64 in eastern Waynesboro, connects the city with Hohenwald to the northeast. The Natchez Trace Parkway intersects US 64 a few miles east of Waynesboro.

Waynesboro lies along the banks of the Green River, which slices a narrow valley oriented north-to-south en route to its mouth along the Buffalo River to the north.  Hurricane Creek, which approaches from the southeast, empties into the Green River just north of the city.  Much of the forest northwest of Waynesboro is part of the Eagle Creek Wildlife Management Area.

Climate

Demographics

2020 census

As of the 2020 United States census, there were 2,317 people, 937 households, and 655 families residing in the city.

2000 census
As of the census of 2000, there were 2,228 people, 954 households, and 601 families residing in the city. The population density was 904.2 people per square mile (349.7/km2). There were 1,071 housing units at an average density of 434.7 per square mile (168.1/km2). The racial makeup of the city was 97.04% White, 1.39% African American, 0.22% Native American, 0.45% Asian, 0.09% Pacific Islander, 0.22% from other races, and 0.58% from two or more races. Hispanic or Latino of any race were 1.03% of the population.

There were 954 households, out of which 27.7% had children under the age of 18 living with them, 47.1% were married couples living together, 13.1% had a female householder with no husband present, and 37.0% were non-families. 35.1% of all households were made up of individuals, and 18.3% had someone living alone who was 65 years of age or older. The average household size was 2.21 and the average family size was 2.84.

In the city, the population was spread out, with 23.1% under the age of 18, 7.7% from 18 to 24, 25.9% from 25 to 44, 23.4% from 45 to 64, and 19.9% who were 65 years of age or older. The median age was 40 years. For every 100 females, there were 87.1 males. For every 100 females age 18 and over, there were 79.6 males.

The median income for a household in the city was $25,196, and the median income for a family was $33,917. Males had a median income of $27,263 versus $17,379 for females. The per capita income for the city was $15,037. About 14.0% of families and 16.3% of the population were below the poverty line, including 16.9% of those under age 18 and 15.2% of those age 65 or over.

Education
 Waynesboro Elementary School
 Waynesboro Middle School
 Wayne County High School
 Wayne County Technology Center
Hollis Academy

Media

Radio stations
 WWON Big Oldies 930
 W210BE 89.9 American Family Radio
WWON-FM 100.7.

Infrastructure

Highways

Notable people
 Clay Allison, Old West gun fighter
 Mark Collie, country music singer
 Greg Seitz, director of athletics, Jacksonville State University

References

External links

 

Cities in Tennessee
Cities in Wayne County, Tennessee
County seats in Tennessee